Britain's Greatest Machines with Chris Barrie is a documentary television series from National Geographic Channel. It is showing the technological progress of the 19th and 20th centuries from a British point of view. Chris Barrie is the host and is testing various means of transportation.

Series 1

Series 2

References 
 National Geographic Channel

Documentary television series about technology
Industrial history of the United Kingdom
2009 British television series debuts
2010 British television series endings
British documentary television series